Archie James Beale (born 22 November 1997), known professionally as Archie Renaux, is an English actor and model. He is known for his roles in the BBC One miniseries Gold Digger (2019) and the Netflix series Shadow and Bone (2021–).

Early life and education
Renaux is from Tolworth in Kingston upon Thames. His mother's side of the family is Anglo-Indian. He has two sisters and a brother. Renaux attended Richard Challoner School before going on to train at the Unseen, a drama school in London. He quit his 9–5 job as an air conditioning engineer to become an actor.

Career
Renaux began his career in modelling, landing gigs with the likes of Topman, Nasir Mazhar, Moss Bros, Gay Times Magazine, and Men's Fashion Week.

In 2017, Renaux was cast in the dystopian film Zero. In 2019, he made his television debut with a guest role in the Amazon Prime series Hanna and, as announced in 2018, with a main as Leo Day in the 2019 BBC One miniseries Gold Digger. Renaux had small roles as Alex in the film Voyagers and Bobby in Marvel's Morbius.

In October 2019, it was announced Renaux would star as Malyen "Mal" Oretsev in the 2021 Netflix series Shadow and Bone, an adaptation of the overlapping fantasy book series Shadow and Bone and Six of Crows by Leigh Bardugo. In 2022, Renaux appeared in the Amazon Prime medieval comedy film Catherine Called Birdy and the Apple TV+ biographical film The Greatest Beer Run Ever. He has upcoming roles in the films The Other Zoey and Upgraded, as well as the next Alien installment.

Personal life
Renaux announced through a post on Instagram in June 2020 that he and his girlfriend, Annie, were expecting a child. Their daughter was born in October 2020.

Filmography

Film

Television

Music videos

References

External links

Living people
1997 births
21st-century English male actors
British people of Anglo-Indian descent
English male film actors
English male models
English male television actors
Male actors from London
Models from London
People from the Royal Borough of Kingston upon Thames
People from Tolworth